Oscar Macías may refer to:
 Oscar Macías (baseball) (born 1969), Cuban baseball player
 Óscar Macías (footballer) (born 1998), Mexican footballer